Hello, Sucker is a 1941 American comedy film directed by Edward F. Cline and written by Maurice Leo and Paul Gerard Smith. The film stars Hugh Herbert, Tom Brown, Peggy Moran, Lewis Howard, June Storey, Walter Catlett and Robert Emmett Keane. The film was released on July 11, 1941, by Universal Pictures.

Plot

Cast        
Hugh Herbert as Hubert Worthington Clippe
Tom Brown as Bob Wade
Peggy Moran as Rosalie Watson
Lewis Howard as Walter Guggin
June Storey as Trixie Medcalf
Walter Catlett as G. Remington 'Max' Conway
Robert Emmett Keane as Connors
Mantan Moreland as Elevator Boy
Janet Warren as Receptionist 
Nell O'Day as Model
Dorothy Darrell as Model

References

External links
 

1941 films
American comedy films
1941 comedy films
Universal Pictures films
Films directed by Edward F. Cline
American black-and-white films
1940s English-language films
1940s American films